The 1250s BC is a decade which lasted from 1259 BC to 1250 BC.

Events and trends
c. 1259 BC—Ramesses II makes a peace agreement with the Hittites (other date is 1263 BC).
c. 1258 BC—The Exodus as depicted in the Bible.
1251 BC—September 7, a solar eclipse on this date might mark the birth of legendary Heracles at Thebes, Greece.
1250 BC—Traditional date of the beginning of the Trojan War.
c. 1250 BC—Wu Ding, king of the Shang dynasty, and earliest archaeologically confirmed Chinese monarch begins his reign.
c. 1250 BC—Earliest surviving writing from Ancient China. 
c. 1250 BC—Chariots appear in Ancient China.
c. 1250 BC—Lion Gate, Mycenae, Greece, are made. Citadel walls are built.
c. 1250 BC—Papyrus of Ani created, during the 19th dynasty of the New Kingdom of Egypt.
c. 1250 BC-Tawagalawa letter sent from a Hittite king to a king of the Ahhiyawa

Significant people
 Wu Ding, king of the Shang dynasty.
 Sanchuniathon, Phoenician writer, is born (approximate date).

Fiction
 S.M. Stirling's Nantucket series is set in Bronze Age era, circa the 1250s BC.

Notes